Daniela Fusar Poli (born 17 October 1984) is a road cyclist from Italy. She represented her nation at the 2004 UCI Road World Championships. She also represented Italy at the 2006 European Road Championships finishing 11th in the under-23 road race.

References

External links
 profile at Procyclingstats.com

1984 births
Living people
People from Legnano
Italian female cyclists
Cyclists from the Metropolitan City of Milan
21st-century Italian women